The  is a full-size sedan produced by Toyota. It is Toyota's largest front-wheel drive sedan and serves as its flagship vehicle in the United States, Canada, China and the Middle East. It was also produced in Australia from April 2000 until June 2005, when it was replaced in November 2006 by the Aurion. The first production Avalon rolled off the TMMK assembly line in Georgetown, Kentucky, in September 1994, and subsequent generations have all been manufactured at the Kentucky location to date.

Toyota marketed the Avalon as a replacement for the Cressida, a model discontinued for the American market in 1992. While the Cressida was an upper-level mid-size rear-wheel drive car with a straight-six engine, the Avalon is front-wheel drive, powered by a V6 engine. In recent years, there has been considerable overlapping with its platform mates, the Camry V6 and the Lexus ES, although the third-generation and subsequent Avalon was distinguished by offering extra legroom due to its extended-length chassis. From 2013, the Lexus ES was moved to the extended platform to match the Avalon.

As of 2013, the Avalon is sold in the United States, Canada, China, South Korea and the Middle East. It was discontinued in the United States in 2022.

Avalon is a legendary island featured in the Arthurian legend, fitting it in with Toyota's tradition of naming their sedans the word for "crown" in various languages (Crown, Corona, Camry, Corolla), types of crowns (Tiara), or other things associated with royalty (Scepter).



First generation (XX10; 1994) 

The Avalon was a new model introduced in February 1994 at the Chicago International Auto Show and launched in late 1994 for the 1995 model year. Development began in 1990 under the 299T project code (ending in 1994), with the design phase concluding in 1991 with internal approval of the final design. Design patents were filed with the Japanese Patent Office on 17 February 1992, under patent number 0890183. With almost  of interior space, the Avalon was the roomiest six-passenger car from a Japanese manufacturer marketed in America, despite being three inches shorter than the Mazda 929 and 11 inches shorter than the Dodge Intrepid. Its exterior dimensions were almost exactly the same as its perennial competitors, the Nissan Maxima, Mitsubishi Diamante and Mazda Millenia.

Toyota first introduced the "Avalon" name on a concept convertible sedan at the 1991 Tokyo Motor Show.

The Avalon was available with a front bench seat for six-passenger seating, and its column shifter was the first such feature in an American Toyota car since the T130 series Corona. The XL models were similar to the LE models of other Toyota vehicles, and the XLS models were similar to the XLE models of other Toyota vehicles. Traction control was optional. In 1997 for the 1998 model year a mid-cycle refresh was introduced with minor updates to the front and rear fascias. Also for 1998, the Avalon's structure was modified to improve safety while front seat-mounted side airbags became standard.

The first-generation Avalon was also sold in Japan (vehicles were made in the United States and exported to Japan) as a right-hand drive model, and was exclusive to Toyopet Store locations. In Japan, it was the largest front-wheel drive sedan at Toyopet Store locations, and was sold alongside the front-engine, rear-drive Toyota Celsior, and was available in 3.0 and 3.0 G grade levels, with the "Coach Edition" available as an option starting in late 1997 (equivalent to the 1998 model year). In Japan it was classified as a luxury car (and so carried an expensive, yearly road tax) because of Japanese government dimension regulations that placed it in the "large car" category and its, by Japanese standards, large engine displacement.

Australia (2000–2005) 
In 1999, Toyota recycled the old tooling for the old Avalon by shipping it to Toyota Australia, and launched the old Avalon as an "all-new" model in June 2000. The new Australian Avalon had an identical body to the old 1994 Avalon. The Australian model was built in the Melbourne suburb of Altona, made in both right-hand drive (for Australia, New Zealand, and some parts of Asia), as well as left-hand drive for the Middle East. The Camry was also made at this plant. The Avalon performed poorly in Australia; critics called the car "boring", and sales were low. The Avalon was front-wheel drive and available only as a sedan with a 3.0-liter V6 and automatic transmission. By contrast, its intended rivals, the Ford Falcon and Holden Commodore, were rear wheel drive and offered a wider range of body styles and engine/transmission options.

Toyota had originally decided to rename the Avalon as the Centaur for the Australian market, after the mythological creature of the same name. However, the Australian hospital ship AHS Centaur had been torpedoed and sunk by a Japanese submarine during World War II and when Toyota Australia was made aware of this prior to the release of the car, they organised for the Centaur badges to be destroyed and removed the offending nameplate from all paperwork and advertising. As a result, the original "Avalon" name prevailed for the Australian market.

When the Avalon was updated in 2001 as the "Mark II" (not to be confused with the separate Toyota Mark II), the model range was lightly revised and new hubcaps/alloy wheels were fitted. The "Mark III" designation refers to the 2003 to 2005 facelift models.

Many buyers preferred the V6-powered Camry instead of the Avalon, and the 2003 facelift failed to rectify the lower than expected sales, with many criticizing the new front styling. Because of these sales concerns, Toyota Australia marketed it towards taxi fleets, against the Ford Falcon, with a specially developed dual-fuel (LPG and gasoline)-compatible engine. Avalon production ceased in mid-2005. In November 2006, Toyota introduced its replacement, the Toyota Aurion (XV40).

Pre-facelift

Facelift

Toyota X-Runner Concept 
At the 2003 Melbourne and Sydney International Motor Shows, Toyota Australia unveiled the X-Runner Concept, a coupe utility version of the Avalon. The suspension AWD parts were borrowed from the Lexus RX and the rear axle came from the Tarago van. It was intended for production, but Toyota of Australia could not get approval from the parent company.

Second generation (XX20; 1999) 

The second-generation Avalon grew larger in almost every respect, except wheelbase.

This Avalon was available in two trims: the basic XL and the upscale XLS. Standard features include electroluminescent Optitron gauges, 4-wheel disc ABS, front torso side airbags and 15" alloy wheels. Optional were a JBL audio system, Vehicle Stability Control, and a front row bench seat, allowing up to six passengers—a characteristic of large sized cars. However the front center seat is a tight fit for an adult passenger. Dual climate control, larger 16" wheels, and driver's and passenger's power seats were also available.

This second-generation Avalon also featured a built-in 115 V AC power inverter, the first car with such a feature. This was dropped in the third-generation Avalon; yet, the Toyota Highlander, Matrix, Sienna, and Scion models now offer such an inverter.

The Avalon received a mid-cycle facelift for the 2003 model year, with a new grille and modified headlights and tail lights. The minor interior changes included an optional navigation system, woodgrain-style trimmed steering wheel for the XLS, slightly modified gauges, and a chrome emblem steering wheel added onto the XL (once only standard for the XLS).

The Japanese Toyota Pronard was reassigned from Toyopet Store and was now exclusive to the former Vista Store network as Toyota Netz locations, slotted between the larger Toyota Aristo and smaller Verossa and Altezza. Some of the optional equipment installed in the Pronard, to enhance its luxury, was the TEMS ride control technology. Due to poor sales, Toyota did not export the third-generation Avalon to Japan; thus, the Toyota Pronard has been discontinued.

In the Insurance Institute for Highway Safety (IIHS) frontal crash test the Avalon received a "Good" overall score with the "Good" in all six measured categories.

Unlike the first-generation model, there was no Australian production or sales of this or later models.

Third generation (XX30; 2004) 

The Avalon underwent a redesign for 2005, and was unveiled to the public at the January 2005 North American International Auto Show. It went on sale in February 2005. Toyota reportedly cut the Avalon's production development time down from 29.5 months to 18 months. The third generation Avalon was not sold in Europe or Japan.

The redesign dropped the front bench seat option, a feature once common among large American sedans such as Buicks and Cadillacs, and featured a semi-flat rear floor to help increase rear passenger comfort.

The engine was mated to a 5-speed sequential shift automatic. Actual power output did not change.

The Avalon came in four trims: the standard (base) XL, Touring, XLS, and Limited. The XL model included 16" alloy wheels, while other trims came with larger 17" wheels. Performance-oriented tires were fitted to the Touring and Limited trims.

The XL included dual-climate automatic temperature controls and steering wheel-mounted audio and climate controls. The Touring trim offered faux aluminum and all-black leather interior, a sport-tuned suspension, unique powder-coated gray wheels, and a trunk lip-mounted spoiler. The XLS introduced standard cargo nets, six-disc CD changer, a power sliding-glass moonroof, electrochromic auto dimming rear-view and driver's side-view mirrors, four-way passenger power seat and a HomeLink transceiver. The high-end Limited trim offered air-ventilated seats with a power driver's seat cushion length adjuster, Toyota's Smart Key System with keyless push-button start and entry, a quieter acoustic windshield, rain-sensing windshield wipers, an upgraded 12-speaker JBL audio system, "in-glass" LED turn signals on the side mirrors and a wood-trimmed steering wheel and shift gear lever. A navigation system was optional for every trim level other than the XL version. The Avalon had a flat rear floor design and reclining rear seats. Vehicle Stability Control was optional on all trim levels. Other options included a keyless Remote Engine Start, glass breakage sensor, rear window power sunshade and, on Limited models, a Dynamic Laser Cruise Control system. HID lighting with auto-leveling was standard on Touring and Limited grades.

On 5 December 2011, Toyota announced that Toyota Avalons assembled in the US would be exported to South Korea and shipped from Port of Hueneme in Oxnard, California.

Yearly changes 

 2005, for the 2006 model year: Toyota expanded the availability of Vehicle Stability Control to XL and Touring trim levels.
 2006, for the 2007 model year: the tire pressure monitoring system became standard across all trims and the navigation system made optional for the Touring trim level.
 2007, for the 2008 model year: Avalon released received a mild facelift. Rear taillights received subtle tinting, and the front fascia was redesigned. Other changes included a six-speed automatic transmission, chrome exterior door handles for the "Limited" trim, restyled alloy wheels for the "Touring" and "XLS" trims, a built-in remote key, upgraded rear brakes, and Bluetooth integration with all JBL Synthesis audio systems. "Touring" models received a color-keyed grille, "XLS" and "Limited" models had a chrome grille, and all models included an in-dash six-CD changer.
 2008, for the 2009 model year: Avalon offered a few changes: Vehicle Stability Control [VSC] became standard on all trim levels, and the Touring version was no longer offered. XLS and Limited leather seats now offered a Dark Charcoal color, and the Indigo Ink Pearl exterior color was replaced with Cocoa Bean Metallic.
 2009, for the 2010 model year: Offered two updates: all passenger windows received an automatic up/down function, as opposed to just the driver and front passenger's side, and a new accelerator pedal was redesigned.

 2010, for the 2011 model year: The facelifted Avalon went on sale in April 2010, with revised styling and only two trim lines: a base Avalon model and a more upscale Limited trim. A backup camera became standard using either the rear view mirror or navigation screen for a display, and exterior side mirrors with integrated turn signals now folded in. The updated navigation system now had real-time traffic updates. Other changes included a redesigned instrument cluster and center console, new wood-style trim, new sheetmetal, and a different rear and front fascia design. The front and tail lights included LED piping, and fuel economy was slightly improved to an EPA-estimated 20/29/23 (city/highway/combined) mpg rating. The revised Avalon had a new brake-override control. It had an improved suspension system and a 12-speaker JBL Synthesis system which was only available on the Limited trim. 17" wheels were also standard on both trims although the Limited model has 10 spokes. Other exterior differences on the Limited included HID projector headlamps.

Safety 
The Avalon came standard with anti-lock brakes, electronic brakeforce distribution, brake assist, dual front airbags, front row side torso airbags, front and rear side curtain airbags, and a driver's knee airbag. For 2009 models Vehicle Stability Control, traction control became standard while active head restraints were added. In 2010, the Star Safety System was added for the 2011 model year.

The Avalon was subject to the 2009–11 Toyota vehicle recalls. 2011 and later model years come standard with a brake-override system.

The Avalon received a "Good" overall score in both the Insurance Institute for Highway Safety (IIHS) frontal offset and side impact tests. In 2009, with the new head restraints the IIHS awarded the Avalon its Top Safety Pick accolade.

A "Good" rating in IIHS the roof strength test IIHS earned the 2011 model year the organization's "Top Safety Pick 2010" designation. The 2011 model year also received the "Top Safety Pick 2011" recommendation.

Reception 
Car and Driver, which had called previous Avalons "Japanese Buicks," rated it at the top of a group of large premium sedans in 2005. Edmunds.com, Motor Trend and Automobile Magazine also rated it top in their own comparisons. Consumer Reports rated the Avalon at the top of its tested group in the large and upscale category, scoring ahead of five other sedans in the January 2010 issue.
In 2010, the 2011 model year Avalon competed against the Ford Taurus and received first place awards from Motor Trend.

Fourth generation (XX40; 2012) 

The redesigned Avalon was partially revealed at the New York International Auto Show in April 2012, to be based on the same platform as the Lexus ES. A new grille was part of the redesign with redesigned lights that were now similar to the Camry. The interior controls have tap touch technology instead of buttons.

In June 2012, Toyota announced the Avalon would offer a hybrid powertrain. The Avalon went on sale in the US at the beginning of December 2012. On October 1, 2013, Toyota Korea announced that the All New Avalon Limited will be sold in South Korea.

Hybrid version 

The hybrid gasoline-electric model of the 2013 model year Avalon uses the revised version of Toyota's Hybrid Synergy Drive power train, similar to the one powering the 2012 model year Camry Hybrid. The hybrid version went on sale in the United States in December 2012. The Avalon Hybrid comes with a 2.5 L inline-4 engine. The Avalon Hybrid uses a 1.6 kWh sealed nickel-metal hydride traction battery, the same as the Camry Hybrid.

2012 SEMA concepts (2012) 
The 2013 model year TRD Edition is a concept car developed by Toyota Racing Development. It includes a supercharged 3.5-liter V6 engine with Eaton Gen 6 TVS rotor assembly, six-speed automatic transmission, six-piston front & four-piston rear calipers, burgundy body color, tinted taillights, color-keyed grille and dual exhaust with polished mufflers, 19-inch wheels with Michelin 225/40R19 tires, a red stitching touch on the instrument and door panels, seats red stitching and accent piping and a JBL GreenEdge surround-sound system.

The 2013 model year HV Edition is based on the hybrid model. It includes 19-inch wheels with Michelin Pilot Super Sport 225/40R19 tires, JBL GreenEdge surround-sound system with 15-speakers, hybrid-blue headlights, turn signals, bright white with electric blue body color and the suspension and braking system from the 2013 model year TRD Edition.

The 2013 model year DUB Edition includes 22-inch-deep concave custom made satin black TIS wheels with Pirelli tires, lower sport suspension, custom body kit, tinted windows, taillights, emblems and plush diamond patterned suede seats. It was built by DUB Magazine.

The vehicles were unveiled at the 2012 SEMA Show.

Facelift (2015) 

In 2015, for the 2016 model year, the Avalon received a facelift which was first shown at the February 2015 Chicago Auto Show. Changes include a new front grille, updated suspension to improve ride comfort, revised wheel designs, and standard Toyota Safety Sense P. The "Touring" trim was also reintroduced for this facelift, this time as a more sporty variant of the top-of-the-line "Limited" trim.

Fifth generation (XX50; 2018) 

The fifth-generation Avalon debuted at the January 2018 North American International Auto Show in Detroit, and went on sale in the US in May 2018. It is built on GA-K platform shared with the XZ10 series Lexus ES. Four trim levels offered in North America are XLE, XSE, Touring and Limited, as well as XLE, XSE and Limited versions of the Avalon Hybrid. An optional adaptive suspension is found in the Touring trim.

Production and assembly of the fifth-generation Avalon is at both Toyota Motor Manufacturing Kentucky (TMMK) plant in Georgetown, Kentucky, United States and Tianjin FAW Toyota Motor Co., Ltd. (TFTM) plant in Tianjin, China from 2019 until 2022. In 2021, assembly of the Avalon for the Chinese market by Sichuan FAW Toyota Motor Co., Ltd. (SFTM) commenced.

Powertrain 
The hybrid is set up similarly to the redesigned Camry hybrid with a NiMH battery pack, though unlike the Camry hybrid, a li-ion battery is not offered.

Discontinuation of US production 
On 4 August 2021, Toyota announced that it would end production of the Avalon in the US after the 2022 model year as the market shifts towards SUVs and electrification. The Avalon will be replaced by the S235 Crown crossover, marking the return of the Crown nameplate in North America after a 50-year hiatus.

The Avalon continued being produced in the Chinese factory for the Chinese market.

Chinese market facelift 
The facelifted Avalon for the Chinese market was launched on 28 March 2022, it retained the five trim levels from the pre-facelift model such as Progressive, Deluxe, XLE, Touring and Limited. It is the first time that the Avalon is not marketed in North America and became a Chinese-exclusive model after it was replaced with the Crown.

Yearly changes 

 2019, for the 2020 model year: Toyota introduced the Avalon TRD alongside the Camry TRD. Based on the XSE trim, it uses the same 2GR-FKS V6 engine with sportier suspensions and sport exhaust system only found on TRD models.
 2020, for the 2021 model year: The Avalon will be available in the US with a four-cylinder AWD variant. This will be available only with the 2.5-liter engine mated to the automatic transmission. Also, the 2021 model year Avalon gets an standard Android Auto and the XSE Nightshade trim level with black wheels, accents and badges. For the hybrid, the nickel-metal hydride battery was replaced by more compact lithium-ion battery pack.
 2021, for the 2022 model year: The XSE Hybrid replaces the XSE Hybrid Nightshade Edition. Also, the XSE Nightshade, TRD, XLE AWD and Limited AWD models were dropped for the final model year in the US.

Gallery

Safety 
It is equipped with Toyota Safety Sense P (TSS-P). The IIHS awarded a Top Safety Pick+ honor to the Avalon, with a "Good" rating in all categories except the passenger-side small overlap test, where it received an "Acceptable" rating. However, Avalons built after September 2018 get a “Good” rating in the passenger-side small overlap test.

In 2021, for the 2022 model year, this was upgraded to the Toyota Safety Sense 2.5+ (TSS-2.5+).

Sales

References

External links 

 

Avalon
Cars introduced in 1994
2000s cars
2010s cars
2020s cars
Full-size vehicles
Sedans
Front-wheel-drive vehicles
All-wheel-drive vehicles
Hybrid electric cars
Partial zero-emissions vehicles
Motor vehicles manufactured in the United States
Cars of Australia
Cars of the United States